The Anūnatvāpurnatvanirdeśa (“Neither Increase nor Decrease Sūtra,” Sutra Of No Increase No Decrease) is a short Mahayana text belonging to the tathagatagarbha class of sutras.

History
The scripture is only extant in the Chinese translation (Ch. Bu zeng bu jian jing, 不增不減經) produced by Bodhiruci (6th century) in 525. Quotations from the sutra in the Ratnagotravibhāga demonstrate that it was composed before 400 CE.

An English translation and analysis of the Anunatvapurnatvanirdesaparivarta was published by Jonathan Silk in 2015.

Teachings

Nirvana
It presents a teaching, delivered in this text by the Buddha to Sariputra, that nirvana is not utter vacuity or the cessation of being, but is the realm of the tathagatagarbha, the unfabricated, utterly pure and everlasting essence of all creatures and beings.

According to Grosnick, in this sutra:

Tathagatagarbha
The Buddha links the tathagatagarbha to the spotless immaculacy of the "dharmakaya" (the ultimate true nature of the Buddha) and "dharmadhatu" (the all-pervading realm of dharma) and states:

This sutra is notable for its doctrinal closeness, regarding the tathagatagarbha, to the "Srimaladevisimhanada Sutra" (commonly known as the "Srimala Sutra").

See also
 
Angulimaliya Sutra
Buddha-Nature
Dolpopa
Kunjed Gyalpo Tantra
Mahayana Mahaparinirvana Sutra
Purity in Buddhism
Srimala Sutra
Tathagatagarbha Sutra

References

External links
 Appreciation of the Nirvana Sutra and Tathagatagarbha Doctrines
 Buddha Pronounces the Sūtra of Neither Increase Nor Decrease, translated by Bodhiruci

Mahayana texts